AMST may refer to:

 Academy for Medical Science Technology, part of high school Bergen County Academies in New Jersey, United States
Advanced Medium STOL Transport
 Academy of Medical Sciences and Technology, Khartoum